The regional election of 1975 took place on 15 June 1975. Ten new seats were added to the Regional Council following the 1971 census.

Events
Christian Democracy was narrowly behind the Italian Communist Party. After the election Roberto Palleschi, a Socialist became President of the Region with the support of the Italian Communist Party (Frontism).

In 1976 Palleschi was replaced by Communist Maurizio Ferrara, to whom Giulio Santarelli, a Socialist, succeeded in 1977.

Results

Source: Ministry of the Interior

Elections in Lazio
1975 elections in Italy